Zatrephes gigantea is a moth of the family Erebidae. It was described by Walter Rothschild in 1909. It is found in French Guiana and the Brazilian state of Amazonas.

References

Phaegopterina
Moths described in 1909